Linda Wild was the defending champion but did not compete that year.

Naoko Sawamatsu won in the final 6–3, 6–2 against Yuka Yoshida.

Seeds
A champion seed is indicated in bold text while text in italics indicates the round in which that seed was eliminated.

  Shi-Ting Wang (quarterfinals)
  Naoko Sawamatsu (champion)
  Tamarine Tanasugarn (first round)
  Naoko Kijimuta (second round)
  Annabel Ellwood (first round)
  Rita Grande (semifinals)
  Yuka Yoshida (final)
  Meilen Tu (first round)

Draw

External links
 1997 Danamon Open draw

Danamon Open
1997 WTA Tour